Jeff Brown may refer to:
 Geoffrey F. Brown (born 1943), former member of the California Public Utilities Commission
 Jeff "Kase2" Brown  (1958–2011), American graffiti artist
 Jeff Brown (author) (1926–2003), author of the Flat Stanley books
 Jeff Brown (basketball) (born 1970), American professional basketball player
 Jeff Brown (ice hockey, born 1966), Canadian former ice hockey defenceman
 Jeff Brown (ice hockey, born 1978), Canadian ice hockey defenceman
 Jeff Brown (judge) (born 1970), United States federal judge
 Jeff Brown, British musician and member of Cats in Space
 Jeff Brown (tennis), head men's tennis coach at Louisiana State University
 Jeff Brown, sports announcer and face of Safestyle UK

See also
Jeffrey Brown (disambiguation)
Geoffrey Brown (disambiguation), includes Geoff Brown